Saheed Adeleke Odunsi (born 5 December 1980) is an English footballer, who played as a midfielder for Football League clubs Millwall, Colchester United and Southend United.

He made his debut for Millwall in the Football League Trophy, in the 2–0 home win against Cardiff City on 9 December 1998, coming on as a substitute in the 83rd minute for Tim Cahill. He made his Football League debut against Colchester United in the 2–0 home defeat, on 14 April 1999. He played for Southend United in 2003/04 scoring against Huddersfield Town at Roots Hall in Southend Utd's defeat 1-2 on 4 October 2003.

References

External links

1980 births
Living people
English footballers
Millwall F.C. players
Kingstonian F.C. players
Bromley F.C. players
Carshalton Athletic F.C. players
Colchester United F.C. players
Southend United F.C. players
English Football League players
Footballers from Lambeth
Association football midfielders